Brett is a personal name.

Brett may also refer to:
 River Brett, in Suffolk, England
 Brettanomyces, a genus of yeast
 The Dance Party, an American pop rock band, which was temporarily named Brett

See also 
 Bret (disambiguation)